Trachinotus ovatus, the pompano which is also known as the derbio or silverfish, is a species of ray-finned fish in the family Carangidae, the jacks. It has large, strong fins. It is common in the Mediterranean Sea, and in the Atlantic Ocean from the British Isles and Scandinavia, where it is a vagrant, to the Gulf of Guinea and Angola.

Description
Trachinotus ovatus has an elongated body which is strongly compressed laterally. The background colour of the body is silver with a greenish back. It has a caudal fin which is obviously split or forked and which has  black margins and a white spot on the upper half of the fin. The dorsal and anal fins are marked with black spots. Along the centre line of the flanks there are three to five black spots.

Distribution
Trachinotus ovatus occurs in the eastern Atlantic Ocean  from the Bay of Biscay and in British and Scandinavian waters where it is a rare vagrant south to Angola. Its range includes the Mediterranean Sea from the coastal waters of Spain, the Ligurian Sea, the southern Tyrrhenian Sea, Adriatic Sea, Aegean Sea and the Levantine Sea off Egypt. It is apparently absent from the northern Adriatic Sea. Its range includes Macaronesia and mid-Atlantic islands such as St Helena and Ascension Island.

Habitat and biology
The adults of Trachinotus ovatus are quite common in shallow water where the waves surge. It prefers clear waters where there is a sand or mud substrate. It is sometimes found in lagoons and river estuaries. It is a sociable species which forms schools. Smaller individuals are frequently caught during the night where there are steep rocky shores. The adults feed on small crustaceans, molluscs and smaller fishes. They lay pelagic eggs, spawning occurring during the summer. They will gather around fish farms to feed on the food pellets which fall through the mesh at the bottom of the cages.

Human uses
Trachinotus ovatus is a minor commercial quarry for fisheries and is used in aquaculture. It is also a popular exhibit in public aquaria.

References

ovatus
Fish of the East Atlantic
Fish of the Mediterranean Sea
Marine fauna of West Africa
Fish described in 1758
Taxa named by Carl Linnaeus